The Pines is a Grade II listed house in Putney in the London Borough of Wandsworth, it was home to the poets Algernon Charles Swinburne and Theodore Watts-Dunton.

Location

The building is at 9 - 11 Putney Hill, south of the Upper Richmond Road, Transport for London bus stop Putney Station (Stop H) is outside.

History and residents

The building was built circa 1870 as a pair of four-storey townhouses. Theodore Watts-Dunton moved in during 1879 with his two sisters, brother in-law, and nephew.  Watts-Dunton took in Algernon Charles Swinburne until Swinburne's death in 1909.  Watts-Dunton and Swinburne are seen in an image at the property in 1909 and a blue plaque erected by the London County Council on the house in 1926 reads "Algernon Charles Swinburne (1837–1909) poet, and his friend Theodore Watts-Dunton (1832–1914) poet, novelist, critic, lived and died here".  Watts-Dunton lived on at The Pines for five years after his more famous companion's death in 1909 and then died there in 1914.

Visitors
Essayist and cartoonist Max Beerbohm frequently visited. He described the house as being "but a few steps from the railway-station in Putney High Street" in his 1914 essay No. 2, The Pines., and illustrated a visit in a piece in 1926.  Mollie Panter-Downes researched Beerbohm's visits in the book 'At the Pines' in 1971.

Watts-Dunton also took in artist Henry Treffry Dunn and provided a studio for him at The Pines until his death in 1899.

References

Grade II listed houses in London
Houses in the London Borough of Wandsworth
Houses completed in the 19th century
Grade II listed buildings in the London Borough of Wandsworth
Putney